The  was a limited express train service in Japan formerly operated by Japanese National Railways (JNR) and later by East Japan Railway Company (JR East) between  and  from 1970 until March 2015.

Rolling stock
Hokuetsu services were normally formed of 6-car 485 series (sets T12–16) or refurbished 485-3000 series electric multiple unit EMU trainsets (sets R21–28), based at Niigata Depot.

Formations
The six-car 485 series sets were formed with car 1 at the Kanazawa end and car 6 at the Niigata end. All cars are no smoking.

The 485 series sets had toilets in each car, while 485-3000 series sets had toilets in 1, 2, 4, and 6 only.

History
From 2 October 1978, the operating route was shortened to Kanazawa to Niigata.

References

External links

 JR West Hokuetsu information 

Named passenger trains of Japan
East Japan Railway Company
Railway services introduced in 1970
1970 establishments in Japan
Railway services discontinued in 2015
2015 disestablishments in Japan